Hjortø is a Danish island south of Funen. The island covers an area of 0.9 km2 and has 7 inhabitants as of 2020. The island can be reached by ferry from Svendborg, maximum 12 passengers.

References

Islands of Denmark
Geography of Svendborg Municipality